Rosa 'Brigadoon',  (aka JACpal), is a hybrid tea rose cultivar, developed in 1991 by rose grower, William Warriner. The new rose variety was introduced into the United States  by Jackson & Perkins in 1992. The rose was named an All-America Rose Selections winner in 1993.

Description
'Brigadoon' is a medium-tall, upright shrub, 3 to 5 ft (90—150 cm) in height with a 2 to 3 ft (60—90 cm) spread. Blooms are 4—5 in (10—12cm) in diameter,  with a petal count of 26 to 40 petals. The flowers have a high-centered, cupped, and reflexed form.

The bicolor flowers display  various shades of red, coral, and orange with a white center and reverse. Flowers have a moderate, spicy fragrance, and are generally borne singly or in small clusters. The buds are long, pointed and ovoid. 'Rio Samba' blooms in flushes from spring to fall. Foliage is large, semi-glossy, leathery and dark green in color. The plant is disease resistant and a repeat bloomer. It thrives in USDA zone 6b and warmer.

Awards 
 
 All-America Rose Selections winner, USA, (1993)

See also
Garden roses
Rose Hall of Fame
List of Award of Garden Merit roses

Notes

References

Brigadoon